The Nambikwara (also called Nambikuára) is an indigenous people of Brazil, living in the Amazon. Currently about 1,200 Nambikwara live in indigenous territories in the Brazilian state of Mato Grosso along the Guaporé and Juruena rivers. Their villages are accessible from the Pan-American highway.

Name
The Nambikwara are also known as the Alaketesu, Anunsu, Nambikuára, or Nambiquara people.<ref name="ethno">[ "."] </ref> The term Nambikwara is an exonym originating from the Tupi language family. Its literal meaning is 'pierced ear,' from the words nambi, "ear," and kûara, "hole."

Language
The Nambikwara speak the Southern Nambikuára language, which is a Nambiquaran language. A dictionary and grammar have been written for the language, which is written in the Latin script.

History
The Nambikwara were first contacted in  but did not experience prolonged contact with Europeans until the early 20th century, when Brazilian army official Marechal Cândido Rondon passed through Nambikwara territory to extend the telegraph lines. He estimated that there were around 10,000 Nambikwara. Shortly after contact with European Brazilians epidemics of measles and smallpox decimated the population to only 500 around 1930.

The culture of the Nambikwara was the subject of studies by French anthropologist Claude Lévi-Strauss, which were later analyzed by French philosopher Jacques Derrida in his work Of Grammatology''.

Bands and subgroups
The Nambikuara Nation is composed of many smaller bands which each have their own name.
 Nambikwara do Sararé
 Kabixi do Mato Grosso
 Nambikwara do Campo of Mato Grosso — Rondônia
 Halotesu
 Hithaulu
 Sawentesu
 Wakalitesu
 Nambikwara do Norte of Rondônia — Mato Grosso
 Lakondê
 Latundê, A.I. Tubarão-Latunde.
 Mamaindê, A.I. Pirineus de Souza, and A.I. Vale do Guaporé
 Nambikwara
 Manduka, A.I. Pirineus de Souza
 Negarotê, A.I. Vale do Guaporé
 Tagnani
 Tamaindé
 Tawandê
 Tawitê or Tauite.
 Nambikwara do Sul of Mato Grosso 
 Alaketesu
 Alantesu
 Galera
 Hahaintesu, A.I. Vale do Guaporé
 Kabixi
 Munduka
 Waikisu, A.I. Vale do Guaporé
 Wasusu, A.I. Vale do Guaporé
Sabanê
 Sabanê, A.I. Pirineus de Souza

Notes

References

External links
Nambikuára artwork, National Museum of the American Indian

Ethnic groups in Brazil
Indigenous peoples in Brazil
Indigenous peoples of the Amazon